William Henry Romaine-Walker (1854–1940) was an English architect and interior decorator.

Life
Romaine-Walker was born into a family of art dealers. He was educated at Lancing College, and then articled to the architect George Edmund Street. He was elected an Associate of the Royal Institute of British Architects in 1881, and in the same year began working in a partnership  with Augustus William Tanner, which lasted until 1896.

Works

These include:
Stanhope House, Park Lane, London (1899–1901), ornate Gothic mansion, with Besant.
St. James, Hampton Hill, tower  added to William Wigginton's earlier church, to celebrate Queen Victoria's Golden Jubilee (1887–88).
Canford School, Canford Magna, Dorset, extended (with Tanner) (1888).
Medmenham Abbey, Medmenham, Buckinghamshire, west wing added and remainder of the house much restored (1898) for Robert Hudson
Danesfield House, Medmenham, Buckinghamshire, for Robert Hudson (1899–1901)
Church of St. Saviour, Newtown, Dorset (1892) with Tanner.
Beaumont College, Old Windsor, Berkshire: interior decoration (1902).
Her Majesty's Theatre, London.  Interior decoration (1897).
St Michael's Church, Brighton (circa 1900). Internal features.
Church of St John the Evangelist, Upper Parkstone, Poole, Dorset, with Besant (1902–03).
Moreton Hall, Warwickshire (1906)
Knowsley Hall, Merseyside. Modifications for the 17th Earl of Derby (1908–12)
Tate Gallery extensions (1910, 1926, 1937) 
Buckland House, Buckland, Oxfordshire, alterations and additions (c 1910).
Chatsworth House rebuilding of main staircase (1911–12).
Liverpool Town Hall (1913). Internal modifications and decorations (with Jenkins)
Great Fosters. Modifications (1918–19).

References

Citations

External links 

 

1854 births
1940 deaths
People educated at Lancing College
English architects
Associates of the Royal Institute of British Architects